Firas Al Ali (born 1 August 1985 in Hama) is a Syrian footballer who played for Al-Sheikh Hussein FC in Jordan.

Firas al-Ali is a former defender for the Syrian national team. He also previously played for Shorta, one of the top teams in Damascus and earned $125,000 a season, a fortune in Syria. In 2011, Bashar al-Assad's forces attacked Hama, his hometown and killed Ali's 19-year-old cousin during a peaceful protest. They also killed his niece in her home during a bombing.

Months later, a 13-year-old cousin was killed during a government attack in a village outside Hama.  The next morning, he left home and travelled through rebel-held territories, eventually arriving in Turkey at a refugee camp, where he still resides.

References

External links
 
 Firas Al Ali at Goal.com

1985 births
Living people
Syrian footballers
Association football defenders
Expatriate footballers in Jordan
Syrian expatriate footballers
Syrian expatriate sportspeople in Jordan
Syrian Premier League players